The 2019–20 Hyderabad FC season was the first ever competitive season in the club's history and the inaugural season in the Indian Super League.

Background 
The Hyderabad FC replaced the FC Pune City in 2019 and will debut in the 2019–20 Indian Super League season. FC Pune City was dissolved after the 2018–19 season due to prolonged financial and technical troubles. The franchise was taken over by Vijay Madduri, a Hyderabad based entrepreneur, and Varun Tripuraneni, the former CEO of the Kerala Blasters. The owners decided to move the franchise to their home city of Hyderabad. The club was announced on 27 August 2019. The Hyderabad FC will be the first club from Hyderabad to feature in the Indian Super League.

The club officially unveiled their logo on 21 September and the home jersey for their maiden season on 29 September. The Hyderabad FC will play their home matches at G.M.C. Balayogi Athletic Stadium which has a capacity of 30,000.

Kits

Management team

Players

New contracts

Transfers

In

Loan in

Loan out

Pre-season and friendlies
The Hyderabad FC played a pre-season friendly against an I-League club Real Kashmir FC on 4 October 2019. They drew the match 1–1 with Laldanmawia Ralte scoring the solitary goal for the Hyderabad. The hat-trick from Robin Singh in their next friendly guided the Hyderabad to a 4-2 win over the Velsao with Rafa scoring the fourth goal. The Hyderabad ended their pre-season tour on a winning note as Robin's brace and goal apiece from Marcelinho and Abhishek Halder helped them defeat the Minerva Punjab 4–0 in their last friendly match on 18 October.

Competitions

Indian Super League

Phil Brown was appointed as the head coach of the Hyderabad FC who previously managed FC Pune City. He hired Neil McDonald and Mehrajuddin Wadoo as his assistant coaches and Aidan Davison as the goalkeeping coach.

The Hyderabad FC announced their squad on 8 October for their first competitive season. Despite being named in the squad, Néstor Gordillo will not be available until late December owing to the ban handed to him by All India Football Federation (AIFF). 

The Hyderabad FC made their debut in the Indian Super League against the ATK in an away match at Kolkata on 25 October. The Hyderabad registered their heaviest defeat of the debut season in their first ever competitive match with a 5-0 loss against the ATK.

On 2 November, the Hyderabad came from behind to register a 2-1 win against the Kerala Blasters. This was their first ever competitive win in their third match of this season.

On 11 January, after loss against the Chennaiyin and after losing nine out of twelve league games, manager Phil Brown was sacked by Hyderabad. The current assistant coach, Wadoo, took charge as interim head coach. Former Bengaluru coach Albert Roca was appointed Hyderabad new head coach on two season deal starting from 2020–21 season while taking up the advisory role to the new coaching staff for the remainder of the season. On 23 January, Roca appointed Xavier Gurri Lopez as the interim coach until the end of the season.

On 20 February, the Hyderabad finished the league stage with a 5-1 win against the NorthEast United which also snapped their 14-match win-less streak and recorded their first away win in any competition. They ended their campaign with a last place finish as they registered two wins and four draws in 18 matches in their debut season and were eventually not qualified for the playoff stage.

League table

Results by matchday

Fixtures
League stage

Player statistics

Appearances and goals

Top scorers

Top assists

Clean sheets

Discipline

Summary

Awards

References

Hyderabad FC  seasons
Hyderabad FC